Jordan Junction is an unincorporated community in Tripp County, South Dakota, United States. Jordan Junction is located at the intersection of U.S. Route 18, U.S. Route 183, South Dakota Highway 44, and South Dakota Highway 53, west of Winner.

References

Unincorporated communities in Tripp County, South Dakota
Unincorporated communities in South Dakota